The Strasbourg Mosque or Great Mosque of Strasbourg is a large purpose-built Islamic mosque in the French city of Strasbourg. It is located on the banks of the Ill river in the Heyritz area, south of the Grande Île. It was inaugurated in September 2012 and has a capacity of 1,200 people.

The mosque is frequented by Muslims of North Africa, mainly Moroccan origin. It hosts many conferences and seminars and has an extensive teaching programme for school-aged children.

The former mosque, in use from 1982 to 2012, consisted of a converted foie gras factory in the Impasse de mai in the centre of Strasbourg, near the law-courts. It was not the first mosque to be established in Strasbourg. There have been mosques in the city since 1967 and there are now over twenty.

History 
The mosque was designed by Paolo Portoghesi, who also designed the Mosque of Rome. The design competition included a futuristic proposal by Zaha Hadid. Construction was delayed several times, due to litigation with the main constructors and a decision by the centre-right municipal council of Fabienne Keller to prevent overseas funding. The first stone of the new mosque was laid on 29 October 2004 by the then Mayor of Strasbourg Fabienne Keller. She also revised the original building project, removing the planned study centre, auditorium and minaret and reducing the capacity of the prayer room by 50%.

References

External links
  La Grande Mosquée de Strasbourg

Moroccan diaspora in France
Mosques in France
Islamic organizations established in 1982
1982 establishments in France
Mosques completed in 2012
Mosque buildings with domes
Religion in Strasbourg
Buildings and structures in Strasbourg